Sins of Rome is a 1953 historical drama film directed by Riccardo Freda and loosely based on the life story of Spartacus. The rights of film's negatives and copies were bought by the producers of Stanley Kubrick's 1960 film Spartacus, as to prevent eventual new releases of the film that could have damaged the commercial outcome of Kubrick’s film; this resulted in Sins of Rome'''s withdrawal from market for about thirty years.

Plot summary

 Cast 
 Massimo Girotti as Spartacus
 Ludmilla Tchérina as Amitis
 Gianna Maria Canale as Sabina
 Yves Vincent as Ocnomas
 Carlo Ninchi as Marcus Licinius Crassus
 Carlo Giustini as Artorige
 Teresa Franchini as Spartacus's Mother
 Vittorio Sanipoli asMarcus Virilius Rufus 
 Umberto Silvestri as Lentulus 
 Renato Baldini as Gladiator 
 Nerio Bernardi  
 Cesare Bettarini

ReleaseSins of Rome was distributed in Italy as Spartaco by A.P.I. on January 28, 1953. The film grossed a total of 450 million Italian lire in Italy. The film was released in the United States as Sins of Rome and in the United Kingdom as Spartacus the Gladiator''.

References

External links
 
 
 

1953 films
1950s historical drama films
Peplum films
Films directed by Riccardo Freda
Films about gladiatorial combat
Films about rebels
Films set in the 1st century BC
Films set in ancient Rome
Films set in Capua
Films set in Rome
Third Servile War films
Cultural depictions of Spartacus
Sword and sandal films
Films scored by Renzo Rossellini
French black-and-white films
Italian black-and-white films
Italian historical drama films
French historical drama films
1950s Italian films
1950s French films